The Shadow Line or ShadowLine can mean:

 The Shadow Line, a 1917 novel by Joseph Conrad
 The Shadow Line (album), an album by Godhead
 The Shadow Line (TV series), a UK TV series
 The Shadow Line/Smuga Cienia (film), a 1976 film by Andrzej Wajda
 ShadowLine, a comic books publisher
 Shadowline (Epic Comics), a comic books imprint

See also
 The Shadow Lines, a 1988 novel by Amitav Ghosh